The Secret of the Mountain Lake is a 1952 drama film directed by Jean Dréville and starring Harriet Geßner, Lil Dagover and Fredy Scheim. It was made as a co-production between France, Switzerland and West Germany. A separate French-language film, The Girl with the Whip, was also released.

Cast
 Harriet Geßner as Angelina
 Lil Dagover as Lamberta Pons
 Fredy Scheim as Bürgermeister
 Marcelle Géniat as Maria Pons, die Großmutter
 Michel Barbey as Calix
 Roger Burckhardt as Ein Schmuggler
 Ann Berger as Lauretta
 Andrews Engelmann as Gefängnisdirektor
 Paul Röthlisberger
 Howard Vernon as Borgo, der Schmugglerwirt
 Karl Wagner

References

Bibliography 
 Hans-Michael Bock and Tim Bergfelder. The Concise Cinegraph: An Encyclopedia of German Cinema. Berghahn Books, 2009.

External links 
 

1952 films
1952 drama films
German drama films
West German films
Swiss German-language films
Films directed by Jean Dréville
Swiss drama films
French drama films
Cross-dressing in film
Films set in the Alps
German multilingual films
1950s multilingual films
Swiss black-and-white films
German black-and-white films
French black-and-white films
1950s German films
1950s French films